The Rice Apartments are a historic apartment building in Eugene, Oregon, United States.

The building was added to the National Register of Historic Places in 2006.

See also
National Register of Historic Places listings in Lane County, Oregon

References

External links

1936 establishments in Oregon
Apartment buildings on the National Register of Historic Places in Oregon
National Register of Historic Places in Eugene, Oregon
Colonial Revival architecture in Oregon